Pierre-Gilles de Gennes (24 October 1932 – 18 May 2007) was a French physicist and the Nobel Prize laureate in physics in 1991.

Education and early life
He was born in Paris, France, and was home-schooled to the age of 12. By the age of 13, he had adopted adult reading habits and was visiting museums.
Later, de Gennes studied at the École Normale Supérieure. After leaving the École in 1955, he became a research engineer at the Saclay center of the Commissariat à l'Énergie Atomique, working mainly on neutron scattering and magnetism, with advice from Anatole Abragam and Jacques Friedel. He defended his Ph.D. in 1957 at the University of Paris.

Career and research
In 1959, he was a postdoctoral research visitor with Charles Kittel at the University of California, Berkeley, and then spent 27 months in the French Navy. In 1961, he was assistant professor in Orsay and soon started the Orsay group on superconductors. In 1968, he switched to studying liquid crystals.

In 1971, he became professor at the Collège de France, and participated in STRASACOL (a joint action of Strasbourg, Saclay and Collège de France) on polymer physics. From 1980 on, he became interested in interfacial problems: the dynamics of wetting and adhesion.

He worked on granular materials and on the nature of memory objects in the brain.

Awards and honours
Awarded the Fernand Holweck Medal and Prize in 1968.

He was awarded the Harvey Prize, Lorentz Medal and Wolf Prize in 1988 and 1990. In 1991, he received the Nobel Prize in physics. He was then director of the École Supérieure de Physique et de Chimie Industrielles de la Ville de Paris (ESPCI), a post he held from 1976 until his retirement in 2002.

P.G. de Gennes has also received the F.A. Cotton Medal for Excellence in Chemical Research of the American Chemical Society in 1997, the Holweck Prize from the joint French and British Physical Society; the Ampere Prize, French Academy of Science; the gold medal from the French CNRS; the Matteuci Medal, Italian Academy; the Harvey Prize, Israel; and polymer awards from both APS and ACS.

He was awarded the above-mentioned Nobel Prize for discovering that "methods developed for studying order phenomena in simple systems can be generalized to more complex forms of matter, in particular to liquid crystals and polymers".

The Royal Society of Chemistry awards the De Gennes Prize biennially, in his honour. He was elected a Foreign Member of the Royal Society (ForMemRS) in 1984. He was awarded A. Cemal Eringen Medal in 1998.

Personal life
He married Anne-Marie Rouet  (born in 1933) in June 1954. They remained married until his death and had three children together: Christian (born 9 December 1954), Dominique (born 6 May 1956) and Marie-Christine (born 11 January 1958).

He also has four children with physicist Françoise Brochard-Wyart (born in 1944) who was one of his former doctoral students and then colleague and co-author. The children are: Claire Wyart (born 16 February 1977), Matthieu Wyart (born 24 May 1978), Olivier Wyart (born 3 August 1984) and Marc de Gennes (born 16 January 1991).

Professors John Goodby and George Gray noted in an obituary: "Pierre was a man of great charm and humour, capable of making others believe they, too, were wise. We will remember him as an inspirational lecturer and teacher, an authority on Shakespeare, an expert skier who attended conference lectures appropriately attired with skis to hand, and, robed in red, at the Bordeaux liquid crystal conference in 1978, took great delight in being inaugurated as a Vignoble de St Émilion."

In 2003 he was one of 22 Nobel Laureates who signed the Humanist Manifesto.

On 22 May 2007, his death was made public as official messages and tributes poured in.

On nuclear fusion he was quoted as saying, "We say that we will put the Sun into a box. The idea is pretty. The problem is, we don't know how to make the box."

References

External links
  including the Nobel Lecture, 9 December 1991 Soft Matter

1932 births
2007 deaths
École Normale Supérieure alumni
University of California, Berkeley staff
Experimental physicists
Academic staff of the Collège de France
Foreign associates of the National Academy of Sciences
Foreign Members of the Russian Academy of Sciences
Foreign Members of the Royal Society
French physicists
Members of the Brazilian Academy of Sciences
Members of the French Academy of Sciences
Nobel laureates in Physics
French Nobel laureates
Lorentz Medal winners
Wolf Prize in Physics laureates
Academic staff of ESPCI Paris
Liquid crystals
Lycée Saint-Louis alumni
Fellows of the Australian Academy of Science
Scientists from Paris
Fellows of the American Physical Society
Paris-Saclay University people
Paris-Saclay University alumni
Recipients of the Matteucci Medal
French materials scientists
Presidents of the Société Française de Physique